Mycalesis aramis is a butterfly of the family Nymphalidae. It is found on Luzon in the Philippines.

References

Butterflies described in 1866
Mycalesis
Butterflies of Asia
Taxa named by William Chapman Hewitson